Sabadell is a city in Catalonia, Spain.

Sabadell pioneered the Industrial Revolution in Catalonia with its textile mills, together with its archrival Terrassa. Thus, in the mid-19th century, it became the most important wool city in Spain, being nicknamed the "Catalan Manchester". Today many mills from that period can still be seen, with most of them having been refurbished as residential buildings or other services. Nowadays Sabadell is basically a commercial and industrial city; there are no significant agricultural activities.

Sabadell is an important communications point. Two motorways run beside the city: the C-58 (from Barcelona to Manresa) and the AP-7 (from France and Girona to Tarragona, Valencia, and Andalusia), and some roads link Sabadell with nearby cities and towns: Barcelona, Terrassa, Cerdanyola del Vallès, Sant Quirze del Vallès, Barberà del Vallès, Sant Cugat del Vallès, Castellar del Vallès, Sant Llorenç Savall, Granollers, Rubí, Sentmenat, and Molins de Rei. 

A railroad line crosses the city (the Rodalies Barcelona line from Barcelona to Lleida) and another one terminates in the city (the FGC line from Barcelona to Sabadell via Sant Cugat del Vallès).

History
In Roman times, a little village called Arragone existed near where the church of La Salut  now stands. This grew into the town called Arraona or Arrahona in the Middle Ages.  Another little village was built just on the other side of the river. This second village, called Sabadell, located on a plain, began to grow and its population was about 600 people (152 houses) in 1378. Sabadell was enclosed by a wall, but due to population growth in the 16th century, some houses were built outside the wall. At that time the first textile industries appeared in the town, devoted especially to woolen clothing. The woolen industry grew over the next centuries, and in 1800 the town's population was about 2000 people. 

The 19th century brought two important developments to the town: in 1856 the railway arrived, and in 1877 the town was dubbed a "city". In the 1897 census the population of the city was 23,044 people. The city had become the most important producer of woolen clothing in Spain, and these clothes achieved worldwide fame.

The modernisme movement (related to Art Nouveau) had an important influence in the architecture of the city in the early 20th century  and distinctive buildings such as the modernista Hotel Suís (1902), Despatx Lluch (1908), and the Caixa d'Estalvis de Sabadell (1915), as well as the Torre de l'Aigua (1918) and the Mercat Central (1930), were built during the first half of the century.

In the early 20th century, Sabadell, with Terrassa, was the textile city par excellence, being the driving force of a territory poor in natural resources. The population was multiplied by eight, its industry boosted, particularly textiles and metals, and its economy was modernized in the service sector. Due to this industrial activity, Sabadell received massive waves of immigration in the 1950s, 1960s and early 1970s leading to uncontrolled urban expansion and the creation of some new neighborhoods such as Ca n'Oriac and Torre-Romeu. 

There has always been since those days a rivalry between Terrassa and Sabadell, because both of them wanted to be capitals of the Vallés Occidental, as both were pretty relevant while this rise textile industry. Nowadays, still there are some popular sayings: "Sabadell mala pell" (Sabadell bad skin) and "Terrassa mala raça" (Terrassa bad race).

The growth of industry and population favored the emergence of an important workers’ movement, and Catalanist, socialist and anarchist parties were very influential up until the upheavals of the Spanish Civil War (1936–39). The victory of the Fascist faction in the war was a step backwards for the city, but in the fifties industry recovered and grew once more.  Industries needed workers, and many people came from Andalusia, Murcia, Extremadura, Castile and other parts of Spain to work in the textile and the metal industry. Again, a new workers’ and Catalanist movement emerged, this time against Francisco Franco’s regime and with the support of the Roman Catholic Church. 

Sabadell was the host of some sessions of the Assemblea de Catalunya, a multi-party organization that brought together communists, socialists, Catalan nationalists, Catholics and others against the Franco regime. The 1973 oil crisis and Franco's death in 1975 meant an important change in Spain and, of course, in Sabadell. The economic crisis compelled the city to diversify its economic activities. New commercial and leisure areas (the Eix Macià) appeared next to the traditional industries, leading to important economic development for the city. An ETA car bombing in 1990 killed six police officers.

Main sights
Little church of Sant Nicolau (11th century) is a vestige of the town of Arraona
Casa Duran is a traditional rural house (16th century) placed in the middle of the city
Hotel Suís (Swiss Hotel, 1902)
Caixa d'Estalvis (1915)
Torre de l'Aigua (water tower, 1918)
Mercat Central (Central Market, 1930)
Castle of Can Feu (1816)

Geography
It borders (clockwise, starting from the north) with Castellar del Vallès, Sentmenat, Polinyà, Santa Perpètua de Mogoda, Barberà del Vallès, Badia del Vallès, Cerdanyola del Vallès, Sant Quirze del Vallès, and Terrassa.

Climate

Sports

During the 1992 Barcelona Olympic Games, Sabadell was one of the cities where the football competition took place. The matches were played in the  Nova Creu Alta stadium, which is also home to one of the most significant of the city’s clubs: Centre d'Esports Sabadell. 
This local team, currently in the Segunda División, has played 14 seasons in the Primera División (First Division), once in the UEFA Cup and has even reached the final of the Copa del Rey.

Other major sports clubs are Club Natació Sabadell (Waterpolo and Swimming Club), with more than 30,000 members, OAR Gràcia Sabadell (Handball), currently playing in the First National Division (Group C) of the Spanish Handball League, the Unió Excursionista de Sabadell - UES (Hikers Club), with almost 3,000 associates, two basketball teams, the Sabadell Bàsquet and Sant Nicolau, both of them currently playing  at EBA League, the Fourth Division of the Spanish Basketball League, and two historical tennis clubs, Cercle Sabadellès 1856 and Club de Tennis Sabadell, with 4,000 and 3,500 associates respectively.

FC Barcelona player Sergio Busquets was born in Sabadell on 16 July 1988.

Institutions
 Banco Sabadell, a major bank
 CE Sabadell FC, a football club

European Cooperation
 Covilhã is a member city of the Eurotowns network

Notable people

Joan Oliver i Sallarès (1899–1986): Catalan-language poet and playwright, also known as Pere Quart
Ramon Barnils i Folguera (1940–2001): journalist and translator born in Sabadell
Benet Casablancas (1956–): composer and musicologist
Jordi Gené (1970–): racing driver
Marc Gené (1974–): racing driver and former F1 driver
David Meca (1974–): professional swimmer
Sergio Dalma (1964–): pop singer
Aschwin Wildeboer (1986–): swimmer
Olaf Wildeboer (1983–): swimmer
Bernat Quintana: Actor in El Cor de la Ciutat, Max
Xavier Oriach (1927–): painter
Sergio Busquets (born 1988), footballer
Moisés Hurtado (born 1981), footballer
Miguel Ángel Lozano (born 1978), footballer
Oleguer Presas (born 1980), footballer
Alberto Edjogo-Owono (born 1984), footballer (Equatorial Guinea's international)
Juvenal Edjogo-Owono (born 1979), footballer (Equatorial Guinea's international)
Óscar García Junyent (born 1973), former footballer
Roger García Junyent (born 1976), former footballer
Dani Pedrosa (born 1985), Moto GP racer
Kilian Jornet Burgada (born 1987), mountain runner
Jordi Masip (born 1989), footballer
Cristian Tello (born 1991), footballer
Isaías Sánchez, footballer
 Alfons Borrell i Palazón, painter
 Manel Navarro, singer, entering Eurovision Song Contest 2017 with 'Do It for Your Lover'
Jimmy Jump, pitch invader
Ricard Zapata-Barrero (born 1965), scholar of migration studies

See also
Transport in Sabadell
Sabadell Metro
Murder of Helena Jubany

References

 Panareda Clopés, Josep Maria; Rios Calvet, Jaume; Rabella Vives, Josep Maria (1989). Guia de Catalunya, Barcelona: Caixa de Catalunya.  (Spanish).  (Catalan).

External links

The Ajuntament (Town Hall) web site
 Government data pages 

 
Municipalities in Vallès Occidental